The Chinese Taipei national volleyball team, governed by Chinese Taipei Volleyball Association, is the national volleyball team representing Republic of China (Taiwan) in international competitions and friendly matches. (See Chinese Taipei for team naming issue)

In 2006 Asian Games, the team defeated Kuwait and Maldives in the first preliminary round, but in the second round they lost to Bahrain and were unable to enter quarter finals.

Competition history

Olympic Games

1964 to 2016 – Did not qualify

World Championship

1949 to 1982 – Did not enter or Did not qualify
1986 – 15th place
1990 to 2014 – Did not qualify

FIVB World Cup

1965 to 2015 – Did not qualify

FIVB World League 

1990 to 2015 – Did not participate
2016 – 28th place
2017 – 33rd place

Asian Championship

 Champions   Runners up   Third place   Fourth place

Asian Games

 1998 –  3rd place
 2002 – 6th place
 2006 – 9th place
 2010 – 11th place
 2014 – 9th place
 2018 –  3rd place

Asian Cup

 2008 – 7th place
 2010 – 4th place
 2012 – Did not qualify
 2014 – Did not qualify
 2016 – 4th place
 2018 – 4th place
 2022 – 9th place

Team

Current squad
The following is the Chinese Taipei roster for the 2022 AVC Cup for Men.

Head coach: Moro Branislav

Former squads
The following was the Chinese Taipei roster in the men's volleyball tournament of the 2018 Asian Games.

Head coach: Chen Yuan

The following was the Taiwanese roster in the 2017 World League.

Head coach: Yu Ching-fang

See also

 Chinese Taipei women's national volleyball team

References

Volleyball in Taiwan
National men's volleyball teams
Volleyball
Men's sport in Taiwan